Philip Shahbaz (born July 1, 1974) is an American actor who is known as the voice of Altaïr in the Ubisoft video game  Assassin's Creed and for his portrayal of Hollywood legend, Peter Bogdanovich, in Hulu's Welcome to Chippendales.

Early life and education
Shahbaz was born in Chicago, Illinois. His father is Assyrian, raised both in Iran and Iraq. His mother is Lebanese. They met in Beirut, Lebanon before emigrating to the United States in 1970. His family moved from Chicago, IL to Turlock, California in 1982.

Shahbaz attended college at Whitworth University in Spokane, Washington. He graduated in 1996 with degrees in both Theatre and Communications. He quickly moved to Los Angeles, California and graduated with a Master’s Degree in 1998.

Career
Shahbaz began his acting career in 2005 with a guest appearance on the FX series, Over There. Shortly after, he was cast in several principle roles including shows such as The Unit on CBS, Showtime’s Sleeper Cell, NBC’s E-Ring, and Showtime’s Californication.

In 2007, Shahbaz was cast as the legendary assassin Altaïr Ibn-La'Ahad in Ubisoft's hit video game Assassin's Creed. Since then, Shahbaz has voiced countless commercials and several Netflix series.

Shahbaz has also made guest appearances on show’s such as 24, Grey's Anatomy, Seal Team, NCIS, Bosch: Legacy, and as Hollywood Legend, Peter Bogdanovich in the Hulu series Welcome to Chippendales.

Filmography

Television

Video games

Film

References

External links
 

1974 births
Living people
American male voice actors
Iranian Arab artists
American people of Iranian descent